Moving on Up or Movin' on Up may refer to:

 "Moving on Up" (M People song), 1993, also covered by Belgian singer Roselle
 "Moving on Up (On the Right Side)", a 1996 song by Beverley Knight
 "Movin' on Up" (Primal Scream song), a 1991 song by Primal Scream from Screamadelica
 "Movin' on Up", a song by Azealia Banks, 2018
 "Movin' on Up", a 2000 episode of King of the Hill
 "Movin' on Up", the theme song of the television series The Jeffersons
 Movin' on Up, an album by Keith Frank

See also 
 Movin' On (disambiguation)
 Movin' Up (disambiguation)
 Moving (disambiguation)
 Moving In (disambiguation)